Scythropiodes elasmatus is a moth in the family Lecithoceridae. It was described by Kyu-Tek Park and Chun-Sheng Wu in 1997. It is found in Sichuan, China.

The wingspan is about 19 mm. The forewings are pale greyish orange, with a large discal spot beyond the end of the cell. The hindwings are pale grey.

Etymology
The species name is derived from Greek elasmos (meaning a metal plate).

References

Moths described in 1997
Scythropiodes